is a railway station located in Minamikyūshū, Kagoshima, Japan that opened in 1960.

Lines 
Kyushu Railway Company
Ibusuki Makurazaki Line

Adjacent stations 

Railway stations in Kagoshima Prefecture
Railway stations in Japan opened in 1960